Digama sagittata is a moth of the  family Erebidae. It is found in Madagascar and on the Comores.

Subspecies
Digama sagittata sagittata (Madagascar)
Digama sagittata angasijensis (Comores)
Digama sagittata duberneti (Comores)
Digama sagittata toulgoeti (Comores)

References

External links
 Afromoths: Species info

Moths described in 1926
Aganainae
Moths of Madagascar
Moths of the Comoros